The 1989 U.S. Figure Skating Championships took place in Baltimore, Maryland. Medals were awarded in four colors: gold (first), silver (second), bronze (third), and pewter (fourth) in four disciplines – men's singles, ladies' singles, pair skating, and ice dancing – across three levels: senior, junior, and novice.

The event determined the U.S. teams for the 1989 World Championships.

Senior results

Men

Ladies

Pairs

Ice dancing

Junior results

Men

Ladies

Pairs

Ice dancing

Novice results

Men

Ladies

Pairs

Ice dancing

References

U.S. Figure Skating Championships
United States Figure Skating Championships, 1989
United States Figure Skating Championships, 1989
United States Figure Skating Championships
Figure Skating Championships